George Broun may refer to:

Baronets
Sir George Broun, 2nd Baronet (died 1718), of the Broun baronets
Sir George Broun, 3rd Baronet (died 1734), of the Broun baronets

Others
George Broun-Lindsay (1888–1964), Scottish MP
George Broun, Lord Coalston, see David Dalrymple, Lord Hailes

See also
George Brown (disambiguation)
Broun (surname)